Joshua Giraldo is an American politician. He serves as a Democratic member for the 56th district of the Rhode Island House of Representatives.

Giraldo was born in Central Falls, Rhode Island. He attended Roger Williams University and Providence College, where he graduated in 2008. In 2020 Giraldo was elected for the 56th district of the Rhode Island House of Representatives, assuming office on March 12, 2020.

References 

Living people
Year of birth missing (living people)
People from Central Falls, Rhode Island
Democratic Party members of the Rhode Island House of Representatives
21st-century American politicians
Roger Williams University alumni
Providence College alumni